Wardenclyffe is a property in Long Island, New York developed by Nikola Tesla as a wireless research facility.

Wardenclyffe may also refer to:

 Wardenclyffe Tower, a wireless transmission tower designed by Nikola Tesla on the Wardenclyffe property
 Tesla Science Center at Wardenclyffe, a nonprofit organization established to restore the Wardenclyffe facility